Mazsola és Tádé is a Hungarian puppet animated film made between 1969 and 1973.

Narrators 
 Mazsola: Gertrúd Havas
 Manócska: István Bölöni Kiss
 Tádé: Kató Kovács, Hédi Váradi (1969-1971), Virág Sallay, Irén Szöllősy (1972)
 Mr Varjú: Mara Rebró, István Erdős
 Egérke: Irén Kaszner
 Menyét: Endre Harkányi

List of episodes

External links 
 

Hungarian animated films